Persimmon plc is a British housebuilding company, headquartered in York, England. The company is named after a horse which won the 1896 Derby and St. Leger for the Prince of Wales (the future Edward VII). It is listed on the London Stock Exchange and is a constituent of the FTSE 100 Index.

History
Persimmon was founded by Duncan Davidson in 1972. After leaving George Wimpey, Davidson had formed Ryedale Homes in 1965, selling it to Comben Homes in 1972 for £600,000.  Davidson restarted development again in the Yorkshire area; Persimmon began to expand regionally with the formation of an Anglian division in 1976 followed by operations in the Midlands and the south-west. In 1984, Persimmon bought Tony Fawcett’s Sketchmead company; Fawcett had been a director of Ryedale and he became deputy managing director at Persimmon. The enlarged company was floated on the London Stock Exchange in 1985, by which time the Company was building around 1,000 houses a year.

Steady regional expansion took volumes up to 2,000 by 1988 with a target of 4,000 following the housing recession. Tony Fawcett had died in 1990 and in 1993 John White was appointed as chief executive with Davidson remaining as an executive chairman. In 1995, Persimmon made the first of a series of major acquisitions. Ideal Homes, once the largest housebuilder in the country and then part of Trafalgar House was bought for £176m giving the Group a much stronger presence in the south-east. This was followed by the purchase of the Scottish housing business of John Laing plc and Tilbury Douglas Homes.

In 2001, Persimmon acquired Beazer Homes UK, for £612m, taking output to over 12,000 a year. The deal came about after Beazer and Bryant announced a 'merger of equals' to create a new house builder called Domus. However, Taylor Woodrow stepped in with a £556 million bid for Bryant, and Persimmon bought Beazer, a company named after its founder Brian Beazer, and originally started in Bath. The acquisition of Beazer brought with it Charles Church, an upmarket housing business founded by Charles and Susanna Church in 1965.

In January 2006, Persimmon acquired Westbury, another listed UK house builder, for a total consideration of £643 million.

Operations

It builds homes under the Persimmon Homes, Charles Church and Westbury Partnerships brands.

Criticism

Build quality
Persimmon has regularly been criticised for the poor build quality of some of its homes.

In 2008, a boy was killed by a falling mantelpiece. Persimmon, which sub-contracted company KD Childs to fit the fireplaces, had not checked the standards and had never received documents about how fireplaces were fitted. A mantelpiece had previously fallen at another Persimmon Home but was treated as a "one-off" incident.

Persimmon's build quality was the subject of a Channel 4 Dispatches documentary broadcast on 15 July 2019. In August 2019, Persimmon appointed an independent team of construction quality inspectors to ensure its homes are built to required standards.

In April 2019, Persimmon launched an independent review of customer care and quality of work following criticism. Persimmon had been ranked the lowest major housebuilder in the Home Builders Federation annual customer satisfaction survey. The review, published in December 2019, criticised Persimmon for not having minimum construction standards, increasing the risk of build defects, with a "systemic nationwide failure" of missing and/or incorrectly installed fire cavity barriers in its timber frame properties. In March 2021, Persimmon CEO Dean Finch announced plans to double the firm's team of independent quality inspectors to over 60 by the end of 2021.

In 2021, Persimmon built a block of properties the wrong way round in Colchester. The local authority required them to ensure the building was completed to the original designs submitted.

Health and safety failure
In 2001, Persimmon was fined £125,000 after an employee was crushed to death. HSE investigating inspector Tony Mitchell said: "Companies need to ensure that all safety devices are fully operational. In this case properly fitted interlocks would have prevented access to the enclosure, and saved a life".

Executive pay
In December 2017, Persimmon's chairman, Nicholas Wrigley, resigned over his role in awarding Jeff Fairburn, the CEO, a £128 million bonus. The Persimmon bonus scheme was believed to be the UK's "most generous ever", scheduled to pay more than £800m to 150 senior staff from 31 December 2016.

In October 2018, Fairburn received widespread criticism after refusing to discuss the bonus awarded to him the previous year. When the bonus was awarded he said he would forego half his shares: the final bonus which therefore was awarded £75 million. This was the largest bonus award by a listed UK company in history. Fairburn has said he would give a "substantial proportion" of the bonus to charity; however no details of the charities were given (and no charitable involvement could be identified three years later). He left the following month in a decision that the company described as being by "mutual agreement and at the request of the company".

Late payment
In April 2019, Persimmon Homes was suspended from the UK Government's Prompt Payment Code for failing to pay suppliers on time. It was reinstated around 10 months later.

References

External links
Official website
Persimmon plc corporate website

Construction and civil engineering companies established in 1972
Housebuilding companies of the United Kingdom
Companies listed on the London Stock Exchange
Companies based in York
1972 establishments in England